Major-General Augustus Abbott (7 January 1804 – 25 February 1867) was an army officer in the British East India Company. He was the eldest of several prominent brothers.  He served in various military campaigns including the First Anglo-Afghan War. He died at Cheltenham, to which he had retired, having been discharged from the army due to poor health.

Early life
Augustus Abbott was born in London and baptised on 10 March 1804 at  St Pancras Old Church, the eldest son of Henry Alexius Abbott, a retired Calcutta merchant of Blackheath, Kent, and his wife Margaret Welsh, the daughter of William Welsh of Edinburgh. He was educated by the Rev. John Faithfull at Warfield, and at Winchester College. At the East India Company's Addiscombe Military Seminary (1818–19) he trained as an officer cadet.

Military career
In 1819, aged 15, Abbott sailed for India, as second lieutenant, and by 1835 had been made captain. He then served with distinction in the First Anglo-Afghan War from 1838 to 1842, where he played an important part in the siege of Jalalabad.

Abbott was promoted to major in 1845, and then major-general in 1859; but earlier that year he had already been forced to return home due to poor health. He died in Cheltenham in 1867.

Family
Abbott had the following notable siblings:

 Major General Sir Frederick Abbott, (1805–1892).
 General Sir James Abbott, (1807–1896).
 Major General Saunders Alexius Abbott (1811–1894).
 Keith Edward Abbott, Consul General (1814–1873).

Abbott married, firstly, in 1835, Charlotte Corbyn Becher, daughter of Major Robert Becher and his wife Elizabeth. They had two daughters. She died in 1839.

In 1843 Abbott married, secondly, Sophia Frances Garstin, daughter of Captain John Garstin. The couple had four daughters and three sons. One of the sons, Col. Henry Alexis Abbott (b. 22 Jan. 1849), served in the Second Anglo-Afghan War (1878–1881).

References

Sources

1804 births
1867 deaths
Military personnel from London
People educated at Winchester College
Graduates of Addiscombe Military Seminary
British military personnel of the First Anglo-Afghan War
British East India Company Army officers